16 Little Park Street (also known as Kirby House) is a Georgian townhouse (Grade II* listed) in central Coventry, West Midlands, England. It is one of two remaining Georgian buildings on the street and three in the city centre (the other two being 7 Little Park Street and 11 Priory Row). The name Kirby House comes from Thomas Hulston Kirby who bought it in 1874.

, the building is occupied by the Citizens Advice Bureau.

History 

The front of the house dates back to around 1735, but the façade may have been taken from an earlier building.

The building received slight damage during the Coventry Blitz. The interior was completely restored from 1980 to 1982.

See also 

Grade II* listed buildings in Coventry

References 

Buildings and structures in Coventry
Grade II* listed buildings in the West Midlands (county)
Grade II* listed houses